In cryptography, the Feige–Fiat–Shamir identification scheme is a type of parallel zero-knowledge proof developed by Uriel Feige, Amos Fiat, and Adi Shamir in 1988. Like all zero-knowledge proofs, it allows one party, the Prover, to prove to another party, the Verifier, that they possess secret information without revealing to Verifier what that secret information is. The Feige–Fiat–Shamir identification scheme, however, uses modular arithmetic and a parallel verification process that limits the number of communications between Prover and Verifier.

Setup 

Following a common convention, call the prover Peggy and the verifier Victor.

Choose two large prime integers p and q and compute the product n = pq. Create secret numbers  coprime to n. Compute . Peggy is then sent the numbers . These are her secret login numbers. Victor is sent the numbers  by Peggy when she wishes to identify herself to Victor. Victor is unable to recover Peggy's  numbers from his  numbers due to the difficulty in determining a modular square root when the modulus' factorization is unknown.

Procedure 
 Peggy chooses a random integer , a random sign  and computes . Peggy sends  to Victor.
 Victor chooses numbers  where  equals 0 or 1. Victor sends these numbers to Peggy.
 Peggy computes . Peggy sends this number to Victor.
 Victor checks that  and that 

This procedure is repeated with different  and  values until Victor is satisfied that Peggy does indeed possess the modular square roots  of his  numbers.

Security 
In the procedure, Peggy does not give any useful information to Victor. She merely proves to Victor that she has the secret numbers without revealing what those numbers are. Anyone who intercepts the communication between each Peggy and Victor would only learn the same information. The eavesdropper would not learn anything useful about Peggy's secret numbers.

Suppose Eve has intercepted Victor's  numbers but does not know what Peggy's  numbers are. If Eve wants to try to convince Victor that she is Peggy, she would have to correctly guess what Victor's  numbers will be. She then picks a random , calculates  and sends  to Victor. When Victor sends , Eve simply returns her . Victor is satisfied and concludes that Eve has the secret numbers. For  and  the probability of successfully posing as Peggy is less than 1 in 1 million.

References 

 (eFFS, extended Feige–Fiat–Shamir scheme)

Zero-knowledge protocols